Jere Henry Lipps (August 28, 1939) is Professor of the Graduate School, University of California, Berkeley, and Curator of Paleontology at the University of California Museum of Paleontology. Lipps was the ninth Director of the museum (1989–1997) and chair of the department of Integrative Biology at Berkeley (1991–1994).  He served as president of the Paleontological Society in 1997, and the Cushman Foundation for Foraminiferal Research Inc. three times

Early life
Lipps was born in Los Angeles at the Queen of Angels Hospital and grew up in the Los Angeles neighborhood of Eagle Rock. He climbed the hills of Eagle Rock and became interested in rocks, fossils and animals at a young age.  His father took him on mineralogy field trips all over Southern California. In sixth grade he wrote that he wanted to be a geologist.

Education

After graduating from Eagle Rock High School he attended the University of California, Los Angeles, earning a B.A. and later a Ph.D. from UCLA in 1966.  During this time, he became involved in paleontological research on the Southern California Channel Islands, collecting fossils and documenting the geology on six of the eight islands.  His special interests were the Pleistocene history of California, the paleoecology of Miocene whale-bearing deposits in western North America, and planktonic foraminiferal evolution and biostratigraphy in California, the topic of his PhD dissertation.

Research

After receiving his Ph.D. Lipps moved to the University of California, Davis and began his career in the Department of Geology. Lipps's research concerns the evolutionary biology and ecology of marine organisms, protists in particular. This involves studies of modern species and of particular problems in the fossil record. , he is participating in studies concerning the biology and molecular phylogeny of coral reefs (Papua New Guinea, Enewetak Atoll, French Polynesia) and California foraminifera with the aim of better understanding the fossil record of these forms and ecosystems. Paleobiologic projects include the evolution of the earliest shelled protists in the Precambrian and Cambrian, the biologic constraints on mass extinctions and evolutionary radiations, and the evolutionary history and future of reefs. These projects are mostly field oriented utilizing SCUBA in the modern studies and extended geologic work in the paleobiologic studies.

Lipps was leader of two projects on Antarctic marine ecology for the United States Antarctic Program between 1971 and 1981. During Ross Ice Shelf project Lipps took drilled cores and took bottom samples of the sea floor from beneath the ice. On the Antarctic Peninsula, he and his team used dry suits to dive in icy waters, frequently encountering aggressive leopard seals.  He was the leader of the biology team for the Ross Ice Shelf Project which drilled a hole through the 420m thick ice shelf and recovered organisms on the sea floor some 200m below the base of the Shelf at the southernmost marine locality in the world. As a result of this research, he has an island named for him in Antarctica called Lipps Island.

From 1985 to 1989, he worked in Papua New Guinea on coral reef ecology, supplementing many years of previous work on reefs elsewhere in the world.  Since then his reef work involves localities in Australia, the Society Islands, the Egyptian Red Sea, Fiji, and other Pacific islands.  His paleontological research involves fossil reefs, the Ediacara biota in Russia, Australia, Newfoundland, and California, extinction dynamics in open-ocean ecosystems, and the paleontology of the Galápagos Islands and sites in California.

Lipps is co-author (with Philip W. Signor) of the Signor–Lipps effect, a paleontological principle which states that since the fossil record of organisms is never complete, because neither the first nor the last organism in a given taxon will be recorded as a fossil, hence the complete range in time and the rock record can never be known.

Jere studied and taught about astrobiology, publishing papers on the possibility of past and present life on Mars and Europa as well as icy bodies in the Universe anywhere.

Skepticism and critical thinking
Jere has given lectures about global warming caused by humans. He stated that cow farms are a big producer of the greenhouse gas methane. He has stated that climate change is factually supported enough that it should not be a hypothesis but a theory. In an open letter he wrote to Charles Darwin about the advances we have made since his death on the celebration of Darwin's 200th birthday. He also wrote about his concern with our population growth and global warming. In it he stated 

He wrote an article on critical thinking in which he stated 
He further wrote guidelines on judging authority for the Committee for Skeptical Inquiry stating 
At a keynote address he said

Honors
Along with being the namesake for Lipps Island he is also the namesake for the genus Lippsina and the species Cancris lippsi.

References

External links
 Museum of Paleontology Website Biography
 
 Biobibiliography of Jere H. Lipps

1939 births
American paleontologists
University of California, Berkeley faculty
American skeptics
People from Los Angeles
Living people
University of California, Los Angeles alumni
UCLA Department of Earth Planetary and Space Sciences alumni